Edward Jacobs may refer to:

Ed Jacobs (baseball), Negro league baseball player
Ed Jacobs (sculptor) (1859–1931), Dutch sculptor who won the Prix de Rome (Netherlands) in 1888
Eddie Jacobs, American tennis player, Delaware state champion in 1931
Charles Jacobs (Louisiana judge), Edward Charles Jacobs, Louisiana state district court judge
Ed Jacobs, a character on the TV series Dragnet
Edward Jacobs (composer), composer who is on the faculty at East Carolina University

See also
Edward Jacob (disambiguation)